Michael James Brown (born 9 February 1980) is an English first-class cricketer.

Early life
Brown was born in Burnley, Lancashire, attending Queen Elizabeth's Grammar School in neighbouring Blackburn. Like many of his family, he began playing cricket for Burnley Cricket Club, making his debut for the adult side at age 14. His younger brother David is also a Cricketer.

Career
A right-handed batsman, he made his first-class debut for Middlesex in 1999 and joined Hampshire in 2004.

On 3 October 2008 he joined Surrey after speculation in late September.

On 12 January 2010, Brown announced that he would be spending a three-week spell in Trinidad playing for National League side Clico Preysal Sports Club. He intended to use the opportunity as some additional pre-season training prior to the start of the 2010 County Championship.

He missed the whole of the 2010 season after suffering an elbow injury. This injury, as well as a shoulder injury, was still giving him problems the following season, and he was forced to announce his immediate retirement in late July, 2011.

In April 2011, Brown returned to his roots to take up the role of chairman at Burnley Cricket Club.

References

External links

1980 births
Living people
English cricketers
Hampshire cricketers
Middlesex cricketers
Surrey cricketers
Durham MCCU cricketers
Cricketers from Burnley
People educated at Queen Elizabeth's Grammar School, Blackburn
British Universities cricketers
Middlesex Cricket Board cricketers
Alumni of Collingwood College, Durham